Shagwell may refer to:

 Felicity Shagwell, fictional character, Austin Powers: The Spy Who Shagged Me
Gillian Shagwell,  fictional character, Austin Powers
Shagwell, a member of the Brave Companions, a fictional organisation in A Song of Ice and Fire